Georg Eismann (1899 – 1968) was a German musicologist. After 1945, this music teacher at the  took over as the second director of the Robert Schumann House in Zwickau.

Publications
 Erinnerungen an Felix Mendelssohn Bartholdy. Nachgelassene Aufzeichnungen von Robert Schumann. Predella, Zwickau 1947, .
 Das Robert-Schumann-Haus in Zwickau. Nationale Forschungs- und Gedenkstätten der klassischen Deutschen Literatur, Weimar 1958, .
 Robert Schumann. Tagebücher. Volume 1: 1827–1838. Deutscher Verlag für Musik, Leipzig 1971. 2nd edition 1987, .

1899 births
1968 deaths
20th-century German musicologists